Esther Belin (born July 2, 1968) is a Diné multimedia artist and writer. She is a graduate of the Institute of American Indian Arts in Santa Fe, New Mexico, as well as the University of California, Berkeley.

She is the author of a collection of poetry, From the Belly of My Beauty, published in 1999 by the University of Arizona Press. The book won the American Book Award from the Before Columbus Foundation in 2000. Her recent works include Of Cartography: Poems (Sun Tracks), and online poems like, "X+X+X+X-X-X-X." According to a review from Library Journal, "Belin provides graphic descriptions of the 'wounds' one endures remaining true to a 'native lifestyle.'" In an interview with Belin, Jeff Berglund writes, "For Belin, writing is activism, activism is writing." Sherman Alexie considers Belin to be one of his favorite Native writers. As an artist she specializes in mixed media, printmaking, and beading.

Belin was raised in Los Angeles by her Navajo parents who were part of the Federal Indian relocation program of the 1950s and 1960s.

Works

Poetry 
 Bringing Hannah Home (1998)
 Blues-ing on the Brown Vibe (1999)
 Night Travel (1999)
 X+X+X+X-X-X-X (2017)

Editor or contributor 
 Wíčazo Ša Review - Spring 2007
 SAIL - Spring 2005
 Book Review - Cheyenne Madonna
 Book Review - A Radiant Curve

Interviews 
 Esther Belin on Democracy Now! "On Columbus Day, Indigenous Urge Celebration of Native Culture & Teaching of the Americas’ Genocide" (2012).
 "A map of language charted by Navajo philosophy" Esther Belin is trying to shape a uniquely Navajo way of writing, by Heather Hansman.
 2000 Interview for SAIL (Studies in American Indian Literatures)
 "Planting the Seeds of Revolution" An Interview with Poet Esther Belin (Diné) by Jeff Berglund

See also 
 List of writers from peoples indigenous to the Americas

References

External links

Poetry Foundation - Esther Belin. 
Esther Belin in the University of Arizona Press.

1968 births
20th-century American artists
20th-century American poets
Living people
Institute of American Indian Arts alumni
Native American poets
Navajo people
Postmodern writers
University of California, Berkeley alumni
Writers from Los Angeles
Writers from Colorado
21st-century American poets
Native American women writers
20th-century American women artists
21st-century American women artists
Poets from California
Poets from Colorado
20th-century American women writers
21st-century American women writers
Multimedia artists
20th-century Native Americans
21st-century Native Americans
20th-century Native American women
21st-century Native American women